Beijing Bastards is a 1993 drama film by Sixth Generation director Zhang Yuan, and is one of the first independently produced Chinese films.

Cast
 Karzi "a rock promoter" - played by Li Wei 李委
 Cui Jian as himself
 Wu Lala (武啦啦, Wu Gang), sound-man
 Tang Danian 唐大年, also screenwriter
 Bian Jing 边境 as himself
 Zang Tianshuo as himself
 Wang Wenli 王文丽
 Director: Zhang Yuan 张元

References

External links

1993 films
Chinese independent films
1993 drama films
Films set in China
1990s Mandarin-language films
Films set in Beijing
Films directed by Zhang Yuan
Chinese drama films
1993 independent films